A buckboard is a four-wheeled wagon of simple construction meant to be drawn by a horse or other large animal. A distinctly American utility vehicle, the buckboard has no springs between the body and the axles. The suspension is provided by the flexible floorboards of the body and a leaf spring under the seat(s). The buckboard has no sideboards on the body, leaving the floor quite mobile. In rough terrain, the floor can flex and "buck", lending the vehicle its name.

The buckboard is steered by its front wheels, which are connected by a single axle. The front and rear axle are connected by a platform of one or more boards to which the front axle is connected on a pivoting joint at its midpoint. A buckboard wagon often carries a seat for a driver. Such a seat may be supported by springs. The main platform between axles is not suspended by springs like a carriage.

Invention 

The buckboard was invented by Reverend Cyrus Comstock, a traveling preacher living in Lewis, Essex County, New York who established many churches in the surrounding area during the early 1800s.

Originally designed for personal transportation in the Adirondack Mountains, these vehicles were widely used in newly settled regions of the United States.

Legacy 

In the early 20th century, as horse-drawn vehicles were supplanted by the motor car, the term 'buckboard' was also used in reference to a passenger car (usually a 'tourer') from which the rear body had been removed and replaced with a load-carrying bed. These home-built dual-purpose passenger- and load-carrying vehicles were the precursors of the factory-built 'utility' or 'pickup truck'.

A further "buckboard" example are Cyclecars, such as the Smith Flyer, that were also referred to as 'Buckboard Cars'.

References

External links 

 

Wagons